Shayne Biddle is a New Zealand actor, best known for appearing in the New Zealand feature film, The Strength of Water (2009) Directed by Armağan Ballantyne, nominated Best Children's Feature Film. Asia Pacific Screen Awards. Winner of Qantas Film and Television Awards, for Best Sound Design. He also appeared in the film Amiri & Aroha Directed by David Whittet.

References

External links

Herald Sun Newspaper Film Review

New Zealand male film actors
New Zealand male television actors
Year of birth missing (living people)
Living people